Crassocephalum crepidioides, also called ebolo, thickhead, redflower ragleaf, or fireweed, is an erect annual slightly succulent herb growing up to 180 cm tall. Its use is widespread in many tropical and subtropical regions, but is especially prominent in tropical Africa.  Its fleshy, mucilaginous leaves and stems are eaten as a vegetable, and many parts of the plant have medical uses. However, the safety of internal use needs further research due to the presence of plant toxins.

Ecology
The species is invasive in New Caledonia.

Toxicity
Crassocephalum crepidioides contains the hepatotoxic and tumorigenic pyrrolizidine alkaloid, jacobine. However, in another study, it is shown that the antitumor activity and macrophage nitric oxide produce action.

References

Leaf vegetables
crepidioides
Plants described in 1842